The 2019 Arkansas Razorbacks football team represented the University of Arkansas in the 2019 NCAA Division I FBS football season. The Razorbacks played their home games at Donald W. Reynolds Razorback Stadium in Fayetteville, Arkansas, with one home game at War Memorial Stadium in Little Rock. Arkansas played as a member of the Western Division of the Southeastern Conference (SEC).

On November 10, 2019, a day after the Razorbacks' loss to Western Kentucky, second-year head coach Chad Morris was fired. He finished at Arkansas with a record of 4–18, going 0–14 in SEC play. Tight ends coach Barry Lunney Jr. finished the season as interim head coach.

The Razorbacks lost their last nine games of the season and finished the season on a 19-game losing streak against SEC opponents, dating back to the 2017 season.

Previous season

The Razorbacks finished the 2018 season 2–10, 0–8 in SEC play to finish in last place in the Western Division. This was the worst season in program history, as the Razorbacks had never before lost ten games in one season.

Preseason

SEC media poll
The SEC media poll was released on July 19, 2019 with the Razorbacks predicted to finish in last place.

Preseason All-SEC teams
The Razorbacks had two players selected to the preseason all-SEC teams.

Defense

2nd team

De'Jon Harris – LB

3rd team

McTelvin Agim – DL

Schedule
The Razorbacks' 2019 schedule consisted of 7 home games, 4 away games, and 1 neutral game in the regular season. The Razorbacks hosted SEC foes Auburn and Mississippi State in Fayetteville, and Missouri in Little Rock. The Hogs traveled to face Ole Miss, Kentucky, Alabama, and LSU. Arkansas faced Texas A&M in Arlington, Texas for the sixth year in a row, and the ninth time in the last eleven games.

Arkansas hosted all four of its non-conference games: against Portland State from the Big Sky Conference, Colorado State and San Jose State from the Mountain West Conference, and Western Kentucky from Conference USA.

Game summaries

Portland State

at Ole Miss

Colorado State

San Jose State

vs. Texas A&M

at Kentucky

Auburn

at Alabama

Mississippi State

Western Kentucky

at LSU

Missouri

Statistics
The statistics section was last updated on November 9, following Arkansas' game against Western Kentucky.

Team

Scores by quarter

Offense

Game-by-game offense

Players drafted into the NFL

References

Arkansas
Arkansas Razorbacks football seasons
Arkansas Razorbacks football